In Basel II, a set of international recommendations on bank regulation, standardized approach may refer to:

 Standardized approach (credit risk), a broad methodology for measuring credit risk based on external credit assessments
 Standardized approach (operational risk), a method of calculating a business line's capital requirements as a percentage of its gross income

See also

Basel II

Basel II